The Special Purpose was a jazz/funk fusion band from Seattle, Washington. Formed in the summer of 2004, the group - consisting of John Fawcett (drums), Stephen Fogg (8-string guitar), Christopher Stefanile (guitar) and Tim Symons (keyboards)-- became one of the Pacific Northwest's premier grassroots musical acts. The band's name was a reference to the 1979 cult comedy classic, The Jerk, starring Steve Martin. The Special Purpose allowed the audio recording and free distribution of their live performances. The group stopped playing shows together in 2011.

References 

Musical groups from Washington (state)